Eckhard Krautzun (born 13 January 1941) is a German football coach and former player.

Managerial career
As a player, Krautzun turned out for Union Solingen, Rheydter SV, 1. FC Kaiserslautern, Young Fellows Zürich and TeBe Berlin.

In 1968, he was technical advisor of South Korea / South Korea U20.

In 1973, Krautzun was the first head coach of Canada not to hail from that country or the United Kingdom. After his resignation, Krautzun pointed to the lack of public support for amateur sports in Canada as a reason for the country's lack of success on the international stage. Krautzun went on right after resigning to coach in the NASL with the Vancouver Whitecaps (and later with the Houston Hurricane and Ft. Lauderdale Strikers). He was not a popular coach with the Whitecaps due to the defensive style of play he employed. It was only later with the Strikers (with stars such as Gerd Muller, Teofilo Cubillas, Ray Hudson and Branko Segota) where he loosened up and got his teams attacking and the Strikers had two very successful seasons getting to the semi-finals twice.

In 2001, Krautzun steered Tunisia through 2002 World Cup qualifying but resigned ahead of the tournament, citing interference from the Tunisian Football Federation with his coaching.

Krautzun was in charge of a training camp for promising Chinese youngsters in Bad Kissingen, Germany in 2006, helping prepare the younger generation of players for the 2008 Beijing Olympics. 

In 2007, he acted as an adviser to the Chinese women's national team, stepping down in March of that year due to health issues.

As well as a manager, Krautzun has acted as a technical advisor and scout. He has worked extensively in North America and Asia, where he worked as a scout in China and South Korea from 2001 to 2003.

Honours
VfL Wolfsburg
DFB-Pokal: runners-up 1994–95

1. FC Kaiserslautern
DFB-Pokal: 1995–96

References

External links
 
 

1941 births
Living people
People from Solingen
Sportspeople from Düsseldorf (region)
German footballers
Footballers from North Rhine-Westphalia
Association football midfielders
Bundesliga players
1. FC Kaiserslautern players
Tennis Borussia Berlin players
SC Young Fellows Juventus players
German football managers
North American Soccer League (1968–1984) coaches
SC Young Fellows Juventus managers
Kenya national football team managers
Canada men's national soccer team managers
Vancouver Whitecaps (1974–1984) coaches
Wormatia Worms managers
TSV 1860 Munich managers
Fort Lauderdale Strikers (1977–1983) coaches
SG Union Solingen managers
Tennis Borussia Berlin managers
SV Darmstadt 98 managers
Alemannia Aachen managers
SC Freiburg managers
Philippines national football team managers
Malaysia national football team managers
VfL Wolfsburg managers
1. FC Union Berlin managers
1. FC Kaiserslautern managers
CS Sfaxien managers
FC St. Pauli managers
1. FSV Mainz 05 managers
Tunisia national football team managers
German expatriate football managers
West German expatriate sportspeople in Switzerland
Expatriate football managers in Switzerland
West German expatriate sportspeople in Kenya
Expatriate football managers in Kenya
West German expatriate sportspeople in Canada
Expatriate soccer managers in Canada
West German expatriate sportspeople in the United States
Expatriate soccer managers in the United States
West German expatriate sportspeople in South Korea
Expatriate football managers in South Korea
German expatriate sportspeople in the Philippines
Expatriate football managers in the Philippines
German expatriate sportspeople in Malaysia
Expatriate football managers in Malaysia
German expatriate sportspeople in Tunisia
Expatriate football managers in Tunisia
German expatriate sportspeople in China
Expatriate football managers in China
West German football managers
West German expatriate football managers
West German footballers
West German expatriate sportspeople in Saudi Arabia
Expatriate football managers in Japan
German expatriate sportspeople in Japan